Choi Sung-kook (born 2 December 1970) is a South Korean actor.

Career 
Choi developed an interest in acting from a young age. He studied drama at Seoul University of Arts in the 1990s and launched his career in 1995.

Personal life 
In September 2022, Choi's agency announced that Choi was dating a non-celebrity girlfriend who was 24 years younger than him. They married on November 5 in Seoul.

Filmography

Film

Television series

Television shows

Awards and nominations

References

External links 
 Choi Sung-kook  at Chang Comparny 
 
 
 

1970 births
Living people
South Korean male television actors
South Korean male film actors